Cristina Butucea is a French statistician at ENSAE Paris and at the University of Paris-Est, known for her work on non-parametric statistics, density estimation, and deconvolution.

Butucea completed her Ph.D. in 1999 at Pierre and Marie Curie University. Her dissertation, Estimation non-paramétrique adaptative de la densité de probabilité, was supervised by Alexandre Tsybakov.

In 2019, she was chosen to become a Fellow of the Institute of Mathematical Statistics "for her deep and original contributions to non-parametric statistics, inverse problems, and quantum statistics".

References

External links
Home page

Year of birth missing (living people)
Living people
French statisticians
Women statisticians
Fellows of the Institute of Mathematical Statistics